The golden-bellied gerygone (Gerygone sulphurea) is a species of bird in the family Acanthizidae.  It is found in Brunei, Indonesia, Malaysia, the Philippines, Singapore, and Thailand.  Its natural habitats are subtropical or tropical moist lowland forest and subtropical or tropical mangrove forest.

Taxonomy
Gerygone sulphurea includes the following subspecies:
 G. s. sulphurea - Wallace, 1864
 G. s. muscicapa - Oberholser, 1912
 G. s. simplex - Cabanis, 1872
 G. s. rhizophorae - Mearns, 1905
 G. s. flaveola - Cabanis, 1873

References

golden-bellied gerygone
Birds of Malesia
golden-bellied gerygone
Taxonomy articles created by Polbot